Spichenkovo Airport , also known as Novokuznetsk Airport, is one of two major airports in Kemerovo Oblast area, Russia, Southwestern Siberia located 17 km west of Novokuznetsk. It is named after the nearby town of Spichenkovo. The area has skiing resorts, and the airport is the place where Russian holiday makers pass through arriving to Mezhdurechensk, Kemerovo Oblast.

It is a civilian airport, servicing medium-sized airliners, such as the Airbus A320, Boeing 737-300, Tupolev Tu-134, Tupolev Tu-154, Yakovlev Yak-40, Yakovlev Yak-42, Antonov An-24, Antonov An-26, Ilyushin Il-76, and helicopters Mil Mi-2, Mil Mi-8

Ground handling
Ground handling services are provided by Russian Aviation Enterprise "OOO Aerokuzbass". The Novokuznetsk Airport is a base of the local airline of Kemerovo Oblast "OAO Aerokuznetsk" operating charter flights from/to Novokuznetsk. The Aerokuznetsk fleet includes the following aircraft: 2 Tupolev Tu-154, Antonov An-24, Antonov An-26 and helicopters Mil Mi-2, Mil Mi-8.

Ground transportation
Novokuznetsk Spichenkovo Airport is served by a local bus line operated by Novokuznetsk Transport Enterprise. The trip takes 30 minutes to Novokuznetsk Central Russian Railways Station. The airport is served by numerous Novokuznetsk taxis. Taxis to the city center cost approximately 500 RUR (15 Euro).

The nearby cities of Kemerovo Oblast: Prokopyevsk (15 km), Mezhdurechensk (79 km), Kiselyovsk (24 km), Osinniki (38 km), Belovo (77 km), Tashtagol (133 km), Kemerovo (177 km), Anzhero-Sudzhensk (258 km), Leninsk-Kuznetsky (105 km), Yurga (248 km), Guryevsk (81 km), Mariinsk (273 km) can be reached by taxi and local bus lines.

Airlines and destinations

See also

 Barnaul Airport
 Kemerovo Airport

References

External links
  Official Site of Novokuznetsk-Spichenkovo Airport
 Novokuznetsk Airport at Russian Airports Database
 Great Circle Mapper: NOZ / UNWW - Novokuznetsk, Novokuznetsk, Russian Federation (Russia)
 ASN Accident history for UNWW
 NOAA/NWS current weather observations
 Historical Weather Records for Novokuznetsk
 Spichenkovo Airport is at coordinate 

Airports built in the Soviet Union
Airports in Kemerovo Oblast
Novokuznetsk